The Nakhchivan Garrison, also referred to as the Nakhchivan Army, formerly known as the 5th Army Corps, is a regional military formation of the Azerbaijani Armed Forces. The structures of all service branches and militarized institution in the territory of the Nakhchivan Autonomous Republic together form the Nakhchivan Garrison. It is currently led by Colonel General Karam Mustafayev.

History 

On 7 September 1991, during the intensification of the First Nagorno-Karabakh War, the State Defense Committee (SCC) of the Nakhchivan Autonomous Republic was established by order of the Chairman of the Supreme Soviet Heydar Aliyev. On Independence Day in October 2017, the first garrison military parade was held through the capital in honor of the 25th anniversary of the establishment of the first military unit of the National Army, being attended by the President of Nakhchivan Vasif Talibov and Defense Minister Zakir Hasanov.

Composition 

Thousands of personnel are consolidated into the following branches:

 Separate Combined Arms Army/5th Army Corps, the main basis for the garrison.

 Separate Border Division 
 Separate Combined Arms Brigade of the Internal Troops
 Ministry of Emergency Situations of the Nakhchivan Autonomous Republic
 State Security Service of the Nakhchivan Autonomous Republic

Separate Combined Arms Army/5th Army Corps 
Over the course of the 1992, the military units of the former Soviet Armed Forces located in the Nakhichevan Autonomous Soviet Socialist Republic of the Azerbaijan SSR were transferred to the SCC. On 19 September, the 705th Motorized Rifle Brigade was established. On 21 June 1995 the 705th Motorized Rifle Brigade was transformed into 705th Motorized Rifle Division, with a corps being created at its base. On 8 December 1998, the 5th Nakhchivan Army Corps was established. The Combined Special General Army was established on the basis of the Army Corps by Ilham Aliyev on 18 December 2013. It maintains a special forces unit and a military aerodrome.

Separate Border Division 
On 22 August 1992, the first border detachment of Azerbaijan was established on the basis of the former 41st Border Detachment of the Transcaucasian Border Troops. The detachment previously guarded the Soviet-Iranian and Soviet-Turkish borders President Ilham Aliyev ordered in early 2004 that the Nakhchivan Border Detachment was to be transformed into the “Nakhchivan” Border Division.

Combined Arms Brigade of the Internal Troops 
Two months prior to the formation of the 705th division, on 10 April 1995, the Nakhchivan "N" Battalion of the Internal Troops was established, being upgraded to a regiment in 2002. In 2014, the Nakhchivan Special Operations Brigade of the Internal Troops was established.

Ministry of Emergency Situations 
The Ministry of Emergency Situations of the Nakhchivan Autonomous Republic is an executive authority that ensures the prevention of natural disasters, man-made accidents and fires in the Nakhchivan Autonomous Republic. It is an affiliate of the Ministry of Emergency Situations of Azerbaijan.

State Security Service 
The special services of Nakhchivan operated under the People's Commissariat of Internal Affairs of the Nakhchivan Autonomous Soviet Socialist Republic until 1941. In accordance with the reforms carried out in this area in the USSR, this commissariat was divided by the decree of the Presidium of the Supreme Soviet in April 1941, and separate People's State Commissariats were established on its basis. In 1946, the People's State Security Commissariat was renamed the State Security Committee of the Nakhchivan ASSR and functioned for 8 years with this status. Later, this committee would become the independent KGB of the Nakhchivan ASSR, under the auspices of the Nakhchivan Regional Committee of the Communist Party of Azerbaijan. The geographical position of the Nakhchivan ASSR, with its borders with Iran and Turkey, made its KGB one of the most important during the Soviet era. The Ministry of National Security was established on the basis of Resolution No. 199-XII on 20 September 1992, adopted by the Supreme Assembly of Nakhchivan under the chairmanship of Heydar Aliyev. On 14 December 2015, the modern State Security Service  was established on the basis of the Ministry of National Security.

Training 
The garrison regularly undergoes extensive training, often in the presence of the military leadership. In accordance with a combat for 2020, the garrison launched command-staff exercises in May of 2020. Personnel took part in the Azerbaijan-Turkey joint tactical shooting exercise "Unshakable Brotherhood-2019" held in Nakhchivan from 7-11 June 2019.

Training Center 
The Combined Army Training and Educational Center was opened in May 2018. It is designed to specifically train members of the garrison. It features dormitories, a housing complex, a hospital, parade ground, and a sports campus. The central three-storey building occupies a total area of 7,500 square metres.

Institutions

Military court 
The Military Court of the Nakhchivan Autonomous Republic was established on 27 May 1992 on the basis of the Military Tribunal of the Nakhchivan Garrison. This court, functioning in its current name since 1 June 2000, was until June 2007 the institution with the power to consider cases as a court of first instance. Since June 16, 2007, the Military Court of the Nakhchivan Autonomous Republic began to perform the functions of the Military Court of the Azerbaijan Republic in grave crime cases. In August 2010, the following territorial districts came under the jurisdiction of the Military Court:

 Babek District
 Nakhchivan (city)
 Julfa District
 Kangarli District
 Ordubad District
 Sadarak District
 Shahbuz District
 Sharur District

Central Hospital 
It was opened on 10 May 2021.

See also 
 5th Army Corps (Armenia)
 Tashkent Military District
 Kiev Military District

References 

1991 establishments in Azerbaijan
Military units and formations established in 1991
Army corps of Azerbaijan
Military units and formations of Azerbaijan in the 2020 Nagorno-Karabakh war